Miedzna  is a village in Węgrów County, Masovian Voivodeship, in east-central Poland, in the historical region of Podlachia. It is the seat of the gmina (administrative district) called Gmina Miedzna.

The village has a population of 1,400.

External links
 Jewish Community in Miedzna on Virtual Shtetl

References

Miedzna
Podlachian Voivodeship
Łomża Governorate
Warsaw Voivodeship (1919–1939)